Christian Esposito (born 23 July 1990) is an Australian association footballer who currently plays with North Eastern MetroStars SC.

Club career
On 9 May 2009, he made his senior debut for AlbinoLeffe against Frosinone in the 2008–09 Serie B season.

In July 2009, Esposito was linked to a move to his hometown club Adelaide United. However, despite some initial interest he later denied he wanted to return to Australia.

In June 2010, he joined Prima Divisione Champion Novara on free transfer, which binds him with the Serie A club until June 2014. He has since been loaned out to F.C. Pro Vercelli 1892 and Catanzaro.

References

External links
 U.C. Albinoleffe profile

1990 births
Living people
Soccer players from Adelaide
Australian people of Italian descent
Association football forwards
Italian footballers
Australian soccer players
Australian expatriate soccer players
Expatriate footballers in Italy
U.C. AlbinoLeffe players
S.C. Vallée d'Aoste players
Novara F.C. players
F.C. Pro Vercelli 1892 players
U.S. Catanzaro 1929 players
Serie B players
National Premier Leagues players
North Eastern MetroStars SC players